Happy Journey is a 2014 Malayalam drama film written by Arunlal Ramachandran and directed by Boban Samuel, starring Jayasurya, Aparna Gopinath and Lal. The film is produced by Ashiq Usman under the banner of Milestone Cinemas and features music composed by Gopi Sunder, whilst cinematography is handled by Mahesh Raj and is edited by Lijo Paul.

Plot
The story narrates the life of a young man from Fort Kochi named Aaron, who loses his eyesight during his school days in an accident who then to find a place in the Indian cricket team for the blind.

Cast
Jayasurya as Aaron
Aparna Gopinath as Ziya Sidharth
Lal as Gopikrishnan
Lalu Alex
Balu Varghese as Freddy
Chemban Vinod Jose
Nizhalgal Ravi
Lena as annie
Indian Pallassery as Paanchi
Ramshad
Neeraj Madhav as Santhosh

Production

Development
Boban Samuel who had debuted into Malayalam film industry as a director through the film Janapriyan had announced a project before his film Romans starring Jayasurya who played the lead role in his debut venture. Although those projects didn't rise after 2 years, scriptwriter Arunlal who made his debut with 10:30 am Local Call  and later went on to do Thank You starring Jayasurya in the lead. Through that connection with the lead actor, he pitched the plot to the actor who had contacted Boban Samuel who instantly wanted to do the film, as it essays a story of a blind cricketer. Ashiq Usman chose to produce the film under the banner of Milestone Cinemas after Arikil Oraal. The editor was chosen to Lijo Paul, Art Direction by Vinesh Banglan, Sreya Aravind was chosen to be the costume designer and makeup by Ronex Xavier. Associate directors are Titus Alexander and Pranav Krishna, production controller was Sreekumar A.D., Stills by Antony Jo and Media designs by Ideas Inc.  The film was untitled until halfway through the filming where the title "Happy Journey was chosen, the news was confirmed by actor Jayasurya by saying that happy journeys is the synonyms to the theme of the film and was apt title for the film. It is based on the real-life story of a visually challenged Malayali youth, who is a part of the Indian blind cricket team."

Casting
Jayasurya was already initially cast as he contacted the director after hearing Arunlal's script.  the ramshad manjeri has been (ramo) is the script The casting was quickly taken place as several actors were chosen and initially cast such as Aparna Gopinath who debuted into acting in films through the film ABCD: American-Born Confused Desi and several other supporting actors were cast. Lena was chosen to play a mother that has significance in the plot.

Filming
The filming began at Kochi at 17 November 2013. Main locations of the film were in Ernakulam area such Edappally and Mattancherry.

Critical reception
Cine Shore gave the movie 2.75/5 stars, stating that "Happy Journey A Journey, Good in parts."

References

External links

2014 films
2010s Malayalam-language films
Films about blind people in India
Films about disability in India
Films scored by Gopi Sundar
Films shot in Kochi
Films directed by Boban Samuel